The Mount Zirkel Wilderness is a U.S. Wilderness Area located in Routt National Forest in northwest Colorado. The closest city is Steamboat Springs, Colorado.

Some areas within the wilderness display bedrock composed of metamorphic schists with large garnet crystals.

Habitats
Most of the wilderness is blanketed in dense spruce-fir forests, although it also contains alpine tundra, montane forest, meadow, and riparian habitats.

The southern portion of the wilderness is largely made up of a unique habitat called ribbon forest, formed when large amounts of snow and wind keep tree growth restricted to north–south bands of trees, mostly about twenty feet across. The Buffalo Pass and Mad Creek regions receive more snowfall than anywhere else in Colorado. The central portion contains the wilderness's highest peaks and encompasses alpine tundra. North of this, the lower elevations of the Encampment River headwaters are covered in dense lodgepole pine and spruce-fir forest, which was partially burned in the Beaver Creek Fire of summer 2016.

References

IUCN Category Ib
Protected areas of Jackson County, Colorado
Protected areas of Routt County, Colorado
Wilderness areas of Colorado
Protected areas established in 1980
Routt National Forest
1980 establishments in Colorado